The Twilight Saga: Breaking Dawn – Part 1 (Original Motion Picture Soundtrack) is the soundtrack album to The Twilight Saga: Breaking Dawn – Part 1. It is the fourth soundtrack in the saga's chronology, and was released on November 8, 2011. The soundtrack was once again produced by Alexandra Patsavas, the music director for the previous three films. The track list for the album was revealed on September 26, 2011, followed by the release of the album's lead single the following day.

Background and development
In July 2011, Bill Condon, the director of the film, said that they were still under negotiations for the soundtrack and had 15 songs to choose from, but no deals had been signed with any artists. He also hinted that there was a good chance that the cast's musically-inclined members would feature on the soundtrack, which left chance for Robert Pattinson, Jackson Rathbone, Booboo Stewart and Jamie Campbell Bower to appear on it.

American rock band Evanescence expressed interest in landing a song on the Breaking Dawn soundtrack. Will Hunt, the drummer of the band, said, "I've been screaming for [new song] 'My Heart Is Broken' to land in that, because I think it would fit the story so well." Lead singer Amy Lee agreed, adding, "I think that would be awesome, actually." It is notable that the band had attempted to land songs on the soundtrack of Twilight, but Summit did not approve of the songs they presented. Evanescence were unsuccessful in lodging for a song to appear on the Breaking Dawn soundtrack.

On September 22, it was confirmed that the lead single of the soundtrack would be a song called "It Will Rain" by American pop singer Bruno Mars, released exclusively on iTunes on September 27. The track listing of the soundtrack was revealed on September 26, and is the first to not feature a contribution by British rock band Muse, who contributed songs to the past three soundtracks of the saga. The only cast member to appear on the soundtrack after the announcement of the possibility for musical cast members to be included is Mía Maestro, who plays Carmen.

Track listing

The Twilight Saga: Breaking Dawn – Part 1 (The Score)

The score, like the original film, was composed by Carter Burwell, following Howard Shore, who scored Eclipse, and Alexandre Desplat, who scored New Moon. The album was released in North America on December 13, 2011 by Atlantic Records.

Track listing

Reception

Based on five reviews, Metacritic assigned the Breaking Dawn – Part 1 soundtrack an average score of 63, indicating "generally favorable reviews". Heather Phares, reviewing for Allmusic, said "Regardless of the strengths and failings of the Twilight Saga movies, their soundtracks captured the mood of each book perfectly", and said Breaking Dawns soundtrack "follows suit, delivering more than a few love songs that are surprisingly angst-free compared to the previous soundtracks." Phares concluded, "Still, the most notable thing about [the soundtrack] is its unabashed romanticism, and the album more than serves its purpose as a Twilight-branded wedding playlist."

Entertainment Weekly critic Kyle Anderson stated of the soundtrack's second single, "'Jar of Hearts' songstress Christina Perri's fantastically opulent 'A Thousand Years' sets the tone for The Twilight Saga: Breaking Dawn—Part 1: stark acoustic strums, cascading strings, and a piercing croon expressing undying adoration." Despite awarding the album a B grade, Anderson noted, "If anything, this is the narrowest Twilight soundtrack yet: Even when the volume shifts from quiet to slightly less quiet, these weepy tunes about eternity and erotic mythical beasts grow wearisome."

In a mixed (two-out-of-four stars) review, Randall Roberts of the Los Angeles Times said of the featured songs, "As with all of the installments, half are good, half aren't — all depending on your mood and tolerance for soft rock." However, Roberts admitted, "Those uninterested in slow, weepy ballads should avoid like the plague the Imperial Mammoth, Sleeping at Last and Christina Perri songs, each of which will cause the vulnerable to melt."

For music site Consequence of Sound, Caitlin Meyer said that the Twilight soundtracks had "become a holiday in themselves", but said "Sadly, Breaking Dawn, Pt. 1 fails to follow suit, as it ultimately underwhelms, indulging too much in the melodramatic." Meyer finally noted, "At the end of the day, a whole collection of lethargic, clichéd songs is hardly a compelling listen[,] meaning that Breaking Dawn decisively should be Breaking Yawn and hopefully Part 2 is a little more inspiring."

Charts
Breaking Dawn – Part 1: Original Motion Picture Soundtrack sold 105,000 copies in its first week in the United States, enough to debut at No. 4 on the Billboard 200. This is the first time that a soundtrack in the saga's chronology failed to debut in the top two positions, but it is the fourth in a row to debut in the top five. As of March 2012, the soundtrack has sold 467,000 copies in the United States.

Weekly charts

Year-end charts

Certifications

References

External links
Official Soundtrack for The Twilight Saga: Breaking Dawn – official Breaking Dawn soundtrack site

2011 soundtrack albums
2010s film soundtrack albums
The Twilight Saga (film series) soundtracks
Albums produced by the Smeezingtons
Chop Shop Records soundtracks
Atlantic Records soundtracks
Romance film soundtracks
Fantasy film soundtracks